Believe Pictures is a production company founded by partners Brian Bird, and Michael Landon, Jr. They have created (or co-created) major films such as The Last Sin Eater, the Love Comes Softly film series and Saving Sarah Cain, which won a 2008 CAMIE Award.

Most of the releases went to Fox Faith for home video distribution.

Filmography 
 Love Comes Softly (April 13, 2003)
 Love's Enduring Promise (November 20, 2004)
 Love's Long Journey (December 3, 2005)
 Love's Abiding Joy (October 6, 2006)
 The Last Sin Eater (February 9, 2007)
 Love's Unending Legacy (April 7, 2007)
 Saving Sarah Cain (August 19, 2007)
 Love's Unfolding Dream (December 15, 2007)

References

External links 
 

Film production companies of the United States
Christian film production companies